Gull Lake is a town in Saskatchewan, Canada, situated on the junction of the Trans-Canada Highway and Highway 37, west of Swift Current.

History

The history of the Gull Lake community dates back to 1906, when a development company Conrad and Price acquired and surveyed the town site and subdivided it into blocks. Unlike most other towns located along the Canadian Pacific Railway main line, Gull Lake was not planned and established by the railroad. In fact, there was some animosity from the railroad towards this town that bucked their plan. 

From 1906 to 1909 there was no municipal government or authority other than Conrad and Price: the company had full jurisdiction over civic affairs. In 1909 the citizens of Gull Lake had their community incorporated as a village.

Before 1906 the town of Gull Lake was part of the famed Ranch 76 that stretched over most of southwestern Saskatchewan.  There are still a few buildings in the town that were part of the ranch.

The origin of the name Gull Lake comes from the Cree word for the area, Kiaskus (kiyaskos) which means "little gull".

Demographics 

Climate
Gull Lake Experiences a Humid Continental climate (Dfb) with warm summers and long, cold winters.

Economy
Agriculture is the top employment field with many surrounding farms and ranches, with some work in the oil fields as well.

See also
 List of communities in Saskatchewan
 List of towns in Saskatchewan

References

External links

Towns in Saskatchewan
Gull Lake No. 139, Saskatchewan
Populated places established in 1906
1906 establishments in Saskatchewan